Leunikha is a rural locality (a village) in Azletskoye Rural Settlement, Kharovsky District, Vologda Oblast, Russia. The population was 5 as of 2002.

Geography 
Leunikha is located 46 km northwest of Kharovsk (the district's administrative centre) by road. Gorka Kizimskaya is the nearest rural locality.

References 

Rural localities in Kharovsky District